In mathematics and computing, the Levenberg–Marquardt algorithm (LMA or just LM), also known as the  damped least-squares (DLS) method, is used to solve non-linear least squares problems.  These minimization problems arise especially in least squares curve fitting.  The LMA interpolates between the Gauss–Newton algorithm (GNA) and the method of gradient descent. The LMA is more robust than the GNA, which means that in many cases it finds a solution even if it starts very far off the final minimum. For well-behaved functions and reasonable starting parameters, the LMA tends to be slower than the GNA. LMA can also be viewed as Gauss–Newton using a trust region approach.

The algorithm was first published in 1944 by Kenneth Levenberg, while working at the Frankford Army Arsenal. It was rediscovered in 1963 by Donald Marquardt, who worked as a statistician at DuPont, and independently by Girard, Wynne and Morrison.

The LMA is used in many software applications for solving generic curve-fitting problems. By using the Gauss–Newton algorithm it often converges faster than first-order methods. However, like other iterative optimization algorithms, the LMA finds only a local minimum, which is not necessarily the global minimum.

The problem 
The primary application of the Levenberg–Marquardt algorithm is in the least-squares curve fitting problem: given a set of  empirical pairs  of independent and dependent variables, find the parameters  of the model curve  so that the sum of the squares of the deviations  is minimized:

 which is assumed to be non-empty.

The solution 
Like other numeric minimization algorithms, the Levenberg–Marquardt algorithm is an iterative procedure. To start a minimization, the user has to provide an initial guess for the parameter vector . In cases with only one minimum, an uninformed standard guess like  will work fine; in cases with multiple minima, the algorithm converges to the global minimum only if the initial guess is already somewhat close to the final solution.

In each iteration step, the parameter vector  is replaced by a new estimate . To determine , the function  is approximated by its linearization:

 

where 
  

The above first-order approximation of  gives
 
or in vector notation,
 

 and  respectively. The above expression obtained for  comes under the Gauss–Newton method. The Jacobian matrix as defined above is not (in general) a square matrix, but a rectangular matrix of size , where  is the number of parameters (size of the vector ). The matrix multiplication  yields the required  square matrix and the matrix-vector product on the right hand side yields a vector of size .

Levenberg's contribution is to replace this equation by a "damped version":

where  is the identity matrix, giving as the increment  to the estimated parameter vector .

The (non-negative) damping factor  is adjusted at each iteration. If either the length of the calculated step  or the reduction of sum of squares from the latest parameter vector  fall below predefined limits, iteration stops, and the last parameter vector  is considered to be the solution.

To make the solution scale invariant Marquardt's algorithm solved a modified problem with each component of the gradient scaled according to the curvature. This provides larger movement along the directions where the gradient is smaller, which avoids slow convergence in the direction of small gradient. Fletcher in his 1971 paper A modified Marquardt subroutine for non-linear least squares simplified the form, replacing the identity matrix  with the diagonal matrix consisting of the diagonal elements of :

A similar damping factor appears in Tikhonov regularization, which is used to solve linear ill-posed problems, as well as in ridge regression, an estimation technique in statistics.

Choice of damping parameter 
Various more or less heuristic arguments have been put forward for the best choice for the damping parameter .  Theoretical arguments exist showing why some of these choices guarantee local convergence of the algorithm; however, these choices can make the global convergence of the algorithm suffer from the undesirable properties of steepest descent, in particular, very slow convergence close to the optimum.

The absolute values of any choice depend on how well-scaled the initial problem is. Marquardt recommended starting with a value  and a factor .

An effective strategy for the control of the damping parameter, called delayed gratification, consists of increasing the parameter by a small amount for each uphill step, and decreasing by a large amount for each downhill step. The idea behind this strategy is to avoid moving downhill too fast in the beginning of optimization, therefore restricting the steps available in future iterations and therefore slowing down convergence. An increase by a factor of 2 and a decrease by a factor of 3 has been shown to be effective in most cases, while for large problems more extreme values can work better, with an increase by a factor of 1.5 and a decrease by a factor of 5.

Geodesic acceleration 

When interpreting the Levenberg–Marquardt step as the velocity  along a geodesic path in the parameter space, it is possible to improve the method by adding a second order term that accounts for the acceleration  along the geodesic

where  is the solution of

Since this geodesic acceleration term depends only on the directional derivative  along the direction of the velocity , it does not require computing the full second order derivative matrix, requiring only a small overhead in terms of computing cost. Since the second order derivative can be a fairly complex expression, it can be convenient to replace it with a finite difference approximation

where  and  have already been computed by the algorithm, therefore requiring only one additional function evaluation to compute . The choice of the finite difference step  can affect the stability of the algorithm, and a value of around 0.1 is usually reasonable in general.

Since the acceleration may point in opposite direction to the velocity, to prevent it to stall the method in case the damping is too small, an additional criterion on the acceleration is added in order to accept a step, requiring that

where  is usually fixed to a value lesser than 1, with smaller values for harder problems.

The addition of a geodesic acceleration term can allow significant increase in convergence speed and it is especially useful when the algorithm is moving through narrow canyons in the landscape of the objective function, where the allowed steps are smaller and the higher accuracy due to the second order term gives significative improvements.

Example

In this example we try to fit the function  using the Levenberg–Marquardt algorithm implemented in GNU Octave as the leasqr function. The graphs show progressively better fitting for the parameters ,  used
in the initial curve. Only when the parameters in the last graph are chosen closest to the original, are the curves fitting exactly. This equation
is an example of very sensitive initial conditions for the Levenberg–Marquardt algorithm.

See also 
 Trust region
 Nelder–Mead method
 Variants of the Levenberg–Marquardt algorithm have also been used for solving nonlinear systems of equations.

References

Further reading

External links 

 Detailed description of the algorithm can be found in Numerical Recipes in C, Chapter 15.5: Nonlinear models
 C. T. Kelley, Iterative Methods for Optimization, SIAM Frontiers in Applied Mathematics, no 18, 1999, . Online copy
 History of the algorithm in SIAM news
 A tutorial by Ananth Ranganathan
 K. Madsen, H. B. Nielsen, O. Tingleff, Methods for Non-Linear Least Squares Problems (nonlinear least-squares tutorial; L-M code: analytic Jacobian secant)
 T. Strutz: Data Fitting and Uncertainty (A practical introduction to weighted least squares and beyond). 2nd edition, Springer Vieweg, 2016, .
 H. P. Gavin, The Levenberg-Marquardt method for nonlinear least-squares curve-fitting problems (MATLAB implementation included)

 

 	
Statistical algorithms
Optimization algorithms and methods	
Least squares